Descended Like Vultures is an album by Oakland-based band Rogue Wave. It was released on October 25, 2005, on Sub Pop Records.

Track listing and information
All songs written by Zach Rogue.
 "Bird on a Wire" – 3:40
Zach Rogue - Vocals, Electric Guitar, Bass, Hammond B3 Organ
Pat Spurgeon - Drums, Percussion, Upright Bass, Xylophone, Nomad 237 Organ, Electric Guitar
 "Publish My Love" – 3:44 
Zach Rogue - Vocals, Electric & Acoustic Guitar
Pat Spurgeon - Drums
Gram LeBron - Electric Guitar
Evan Farrell - Bass, Piano
Bill Racine - Drum Programming, Trumpet
 "Salesman at the Day of the Parade" – 2:37
Zach Rogue - Vocals, Acoustic Guitar, Pump Organ
Pat Spurgeon - Tambourine, Vocals
 "Catform" – 3:12
Zach Rogue - Vocals, Electric & Acoustic Guitar, Piano
Pat Spurgeon - Bass, Hammond B3 Organ bass pedals
Gram LeBron - Drums, Vocals, Rhodes
Evan Farrell - Electric Guitar, Wurlitzer
Gene Park - Viola
 "Love's Lost Guarantee" – 4:45
Zach Rogue - Vocals, Electric Guitar, Casio, Nord Lead
Pat Spurgeon - Electric Guitar, Vocals
Gram LeBron - Drums, Vocals
Evan Farrell - Bass
 "10:1" – 3:21 
Zach Rogue - Vocals, Wurlitzer, Hammond B3 Organ
Pat Spurgeon - Drums, Percussion, Bass, Chimes, Autoharp, Hammond B3 Organ, Piano, Transistor Radio
Bill Racine - Guitar Mutilation, Hammond B3 Organ
 "California" – 4:07
Zach Rogue - Vocals, Acoustic Guitar
Pat Spurgeon - Upright Bass, Percussion, Vocals, Bass Drum, Bowed Saw Blade
Aerielle Levy - Cello
 "Are You on My Side" – 4:19
Zach Rogue - Vocals, Electric & Acoustic Guitar, Nord Lead, Casio, Percussion
Pat Spurgeon - Drums, Vocals, Percussion
Gram LeBron - Electric Guitar, Vocals, Wurlitzer, Vibraphone, Percussion
Evan Farrell - Bass, Vocals, Percussion, Snoring
 "Medicine Ball" – 1:54
Zach Rogue - Vocals, Acoustic Guitar
Pat Spurgeon - Drums, Percussion, Glockenspiel
Evan Farrell - Bass, Lap Steel Guitar
 "You" – 5:46
Zach Rogue - Vocals, Electric Guitar, Casio, Piano Strings, Guitar Army
Pat Spurgeon - Drums, Vocals, Cymbals, Piano, Casio, Guitar Army
Gram LeBron - Electric Guitar, Vocals, Wurlitzer, Guitar Army
Evan Farrell - Bass, Piano, Guitar Army
 "Temporary" – 2:45
Zach Rogue - Vocals, Acoustic Guitar
Pat Spurgeon - Pump Organ, Vocals, Accordion

References

External links
Rogue Wave official website
Rogue Wave on MySpace

Rogue Wave (band) albums
2005 albums
Sub Pop albums
Albums recorded at Tarbox Road Studios